Family Values Tour '98 is a live album released on March 30, 1999, through Immortal and Epic Records. It was published on the same day as the DVD version. The live album was produced by Josh Abraham and Jeff Kwatinetz.

Lineup
Artists who participated in 1998 Family Values Tour were the following bands and musicians:
Korn
Ice Cube
Incubus (replaced Ice Cube on October 25, 1998 for five remaining dates)
Limp Bizkit
Orgy
Rammstein

Promotion 
The tour was preceded by whirlwind political campaign-style tour named "Korn Kampaign" (from August 17, 1998 in Los Angeles through September 1 in Phoenix, Arizona) to promote the release of their album Follow the Leader. It took the group all over North America to spread the news of their "Family Values" platform to hordes of fans at special "fan conferences" that were organized at every stop along the tour route. Korn chartered a jet, which took them to record stores in such cities as Riverside, CA, Mt. View, CA, Sacramento, Seattle, Minneapolis, Chicago, Detroit, Philadelphia, Boston, New York City, Toronto, Atlanta, and Dallas. The band talked to fans at every stop, answered questions during the special "fan conferences" and signed autographs. Jim Rose hosted the entire "Korn Kampaign" tour. Celebrities at various stops included Ice Cube and Todd McFarlane.

Reception 
The 1998 edition of Family Values Tour was highly successful, the live compilation debuted at #7 at Billboard 200 chart selling 121,000 copies in its first week, and achieving gold record status by RIAA.

Korn helped to promote then-unknown acts. The results were very promising. Rammstein's album Sehnsucht achieved platinum certification in the United States, also Orgy's debut album Candyass achieved similar success. Limp Bizkit enjoyed even greater success which helped them establish themselves as one of the leading acts of the nu metal wave at that time, and enjoyed enormous commercial success.

Track listing

Bonus content

 "Blind" by Korn is a hidden bonus track featured after "Got the Life". Advance promotional versions of the album omit this bonus track and instead features a fourth Ice Cube track called "Wicked" as track number 15.

Trivia
In one of the more infamous moments, Rammstein's band members dressed up for Halloween. Most of them were practically naked with the exception of Richard Kruspe, who wore a wedding dress. Police dragged the members off the stage for indecent exposure and the concert ended after a mere 10 minutes.
 The song "Jump Around", performed by Limp Bizkit, is a cover of DJ Lethal's former band House of Pain's "Jump Around".

References

1999 live albums
1999 compilation albums
Korn